Ainhoa Santamaría (born 1980) is a Spanish film, stage and television actress, known for her performances in television series such as Isabel and Señoras del (h)AMPA.

Biography 
Born in Vitoria-Gasteiz, Álava, in 1980, she decided to become an actress at age 16, debuting in stage plays in 1997. However, she moved to Zaragoza to study history of art. She eventually graduated from the Madrid's RESAD (2001–2005).

After starting her television career with performances in series such as El comisario, La chica de ayer and Amar en tiempos revueltos, she landed a role as Beatriz de Bobadilla (confidant of Isabella of Castile) in the historical drama series Isabel, playing the role for the three seasons of the series.

She appeared in the first two seasons of Money Heist in the guest role of Laura, the wife of Arturo Román, and also features in the first three seasons of Elite as the clueless investigator digging on the murders happening in the series. She featured in the first season of the dark comedy Señoras del (h)AMPA in the role of Anabel. While initially portrayed as a figure adversarial to the protagonist female gang (an "avenger" of the death of Elvira), the character of Anabel returned in the second season more as an ally of the gang.

Her performance as Enriqueta Carbonell, the wife of protestant pastor  in the 2019 film While at War, earned her a nomination to the Goya Award for Best New Actress.

Filmography 

Television

Film

Accolades

References 

21st-century Spanish actresses
Spanish television actresses
Spanish film actresses
Spanish stage actresses
1980 births
Living people